Constantin Antoniades (24 July 1891 – April 1975) was a Swiss épée and foil fencer. He competed at the 1924 and 1936 Summer Olympics.

References

External links
 

1891 births
1975 deaths
Swiss male épée fencers
Olympic fencers of Switzerland
Fencers at the 1924 Summer Olympics
Fencers at the 1936 Summer Olympics
Swiss male foil fencers
Sportspeople from İzmir